The Hugo Award for Best Fanzine is given each year for non professionally edited magazines, or "fanzines", related to science fiction or fantasy which has published four or more issues with at least one issue appearing in the previous calendar year. Awards were also once given out for professional magazines in the professional magazine category, and since 1984 have been awarded for semi-professional magazines in the semiprozine category; several magazines that were nominated for or won the fanzine category have gone on to be nominated for or win the semiprozine category since it was established. The Hugo Awards have been described as "a fine showcase for speculative fiction" and "the best known literary award for science fiction writing".

The award was first presented in 1955, and has been given annually since except for in 1958. A "fanzine" is defined for the award as a magazine that does not meet the Hugo award's criteria for a professional or semi-professional magazine. Specifically, it must meet less than two of the five Hugo criteria for consideration as a semiprozine: that the magazine had an average press run of at least one thousand copies per issue, paid its contributors and/or staff in other than copies of the publication, provided at least half the income of any one person, had at least fifteen percent of its total space occupied by advertising, and announced itself to be a semiprozine. This is the oldest long-running Hugo award for fan activity; in 1967 Hugo Awards were added specifically for fan writing and fan art. In addition to the regular Hugo awards, beginning in 1996 Retrospective Hugo Awards, or "Retro Hugos", have been available to be awarded for years 50, 75, or 100 years prior in which no awards were given. To date, Retro Hugo awards have been awarded for 1939, 1941, 1943—1946, 1951, and 1954, and the fanzine category has been included each year.

During the 75 nomination years, including Retro Hugo years, 136 magazines run by hundreds of editors have been nominated. Of these, 43 magazines have won, including ties. File 770 and Locus have each won 8 times, the most wins of any magazine. File 770 also holds the record for most nominations at 31; Locus has been nominated 13 times. Mimosa has won 6 of 14 nominations, Ansible has won 5 out of 11, and Science Fiction Review has won 4 of 12; they are the only other magazines to win more than twice. Challenger has the most nominations without winning at 12; the next highest is FOSFAX with 7. As editor of Locus Charles N. Brown has won 8 of 13 nominations, though he shared 8 of those awards with Dena Brown. Richard E. Geis has won 6 of 15 nominations for his work on Science Fiction Review, Psychotic, and The Alien Critic; Mike Glyer has won 8 of 31 for editing File 770; David Langford has won 5 of 12 for work on Ansible and Twil-Ddu; and Richard Lynch and Nicki Lynch have both won 6 of 14 nominations for Mimosa. Guy H. Lillian III has the most nominations without winning at 12 for Challenger.

Selection
Hugo Award nominees and winners are chosen by supporting or attending members of the annual World Science Fiction Convention (Worldcon), and the presentation evening constitutes its central event. The selection process is defined in the World Science Fiction Society Constitution as instant-runoff voting with six nominees, except in the case of a tie. The works on the ballot are the six most-nominated by members that year, with no limit on the number of works that can be nominated. The 1955 and 1956 awards did not include any recognition of runner-up magazines, but since 1957 all of the candidates were recorded. Initial nominations are made by members in January through March, while voting on the ballot of six nominations is performed roughly in April through July, subject to change depending on when that year's Worldcon is held. Prior to 2017, the final ballot was five works; it was changed that year to six, with each initial nominator limited to five nominations. Worldcons are generally held near the start of September, and are held in a different city around the world each year.

Winners and nominees 
In the following table, the years correspond to the date of the ceremony, rather than when the work was first published. Each date links to the "year in literature" article corresponding with when the work was eligible. Entries with a blue background  won the award for that year; those with a white background are the other nominees on the short-list.

Note that five magazines are listed under multiple names: Psychotic was later renamed to Science Fiction Review, Zenith was renamed to Zenith Speculation and later to Speculation, Algol was renamed to Starship, Tangent was renamed to Tangent Online when it switched from a print magazine to an online one, and Cry of the Nameless, a club bulletin for "The Nameless Ones", was renamed to Cry when it began publishing more general material. No other magazines have been nominated under multiple names. Those magazines are sorted under the first name they were nominated as.

  *   Winners and joint winners

Retro Hugos 
Beginning with the 1996 Worldcon, the World Science Fiction Society created the concept of "Retro Hugos", in which the Hugo award could be retroactively awarded for years 50, 75, or 100 years before the current year, if no awards were originally given that year. Retro Hugos have been awarded eight times, for 1939, 1941, 1943—1946, 1951, and 1954.

Notes

References

External links
The Hugo Awards official website
Hugo Awards database at Locus magazine

Fanzine
Literary awards for magazines